The Borough of Welwyn Hatfield is a local government district in southern Hertfordshire, England, governed by Welwyn Hatfield Borough Council.

It covers the two towns of Welwyn Garden City and Hatfield, along with numerous smaller settlements from Woolmer Green in the north to Little Heath in the south. Each of the towns has a railway station on the East Coast Main Line and they are close to the A1 road. It borders the London Borough of Enfield.

The district was formed on 1 April 1974, as a merger of the Welwyn Garden City urban district, with the Hatfield and Welwyn Rural Districts. It petitioned for borough status in 2005, which was agreed to by the Privy Council on 15 November 2005. In April 2006 a charter conferring borough status was granted, and the title of the council officially changed to Welwyn Hatfield Borough Council on 22 May 2006. The first Mayor of the borough, John Hawkins, was chosen on 22 May 2006.

Set within the London green belt, the towns still retain something of their own identities. Welwyn Garden City has a famous heritage being one of only two Garden Cities in the country, and is uniquely both Garden City and designated New Town. They function to some extent as dormitory towns for householders who work in London. The Welwyn Viaduct is a locally important landmark.

Following a proposal put forward by the Welwyn Garden Heritage Trust, Andres Duany, the internationally renowned town-planner, has suggested that designated 'Garden Villages' could be built within Hertfordshire to relieve some of the pressure for new homes, with perhaps a third Garden City to follow.

Politics

The Council consists of 48 elected members, representing sixteen electoral wards, all of which elect three councillors.

After the 2022 election the council is controlled by the Conservatives, who hold 26, or 54%, of the 48 seats. The Liberal Democrats hold twelve seats, and Labour hold ten seats.

Elections to the council are held in three out of every four years, with one third of the 48 seats on the council being elected at each election. Since 1973 control of the council has alternated between the Conservative and Labour parties, with the Conservatives having controlled it since the 2002 election. At the last election in 2019 the council became a minority Conservative administration. Conservatives won 23 seats, compared to 13 for Labour and 12 for the Liberal Democrats.

In 2021, the Conservatives gained 5 seats making the Council a Conservative administration. Conservatives having 28 seats. Liberal Democrats 11 and Labour 9.

The borough boundary differs from Welwyn Hatfield parliamentary constituency only by the single ward of Northaw and Cuffley being within the borough, but in the parliamentary constituency of Broxbourne. All other Welwyn Hatfield wards are the same for Borough and Constituency. Since 2005 Welwyn Hatfield Constituency has been represented by Conservative Grant Shapps.

Wards

Arms

References

 
Districts of Hertfordshire
Boroughs in England